Robert de Sigello (died 1150) was a medieval Bishop of London and Lord Chancellor of England.

Life

Robert was keeper of the king's seal, usually known as Lord Chancellor from 1133 to 1135. He at one point was a monk at Reading Abbey, where he may have forged charters in favour of the abbey.

Robert was nominated to the see of London by the Empress Matilda and consecrated in 1141, possibly about July. He died in 1150, and as his death was commemorated on both 28 September and 29 September, he probably died on one of those dates in 1150.

See also

 List of Lord Chancellors and Lord Keepers

Citations

References

 
 
 

Bishops of London
Lord chancellors of England
1150 deaths
12th-century English Roman Catholic bishops
Year of birth unknown